Samiha al-Qubaj Salameh Khalil (Arabic: سميحة خليل; born 1923 in Anabta, Mandatory Palestine – died February 26, 1999, in Ramallah), also known as Umm Khalil, was a Palestinian charity worker as well as a prominent figure in Palestinian politics.

Khalil's father was the mayor of Anabta, where she was born. She dropped out of high school at the age of seventeen to marry Salameh Khalil. After the 1948 Arab-Israeli War, the couple fled to Gaza where they raised a family of five children, and in 1964 Samiha finally returned to school and graduated.

In 1965, Khalil came to the public eye when she founded the al-Inaash al-Usra society in her garage - it would grow to become the largest and most effective Palestinian welfare organization. In 1977 she became the first and only female member of the National Front Committee.

During the 1980s, Khalil was tied to the Democratic Front for the Liberation of Palestine and detained six times by the IDF; she saw two of her children deported from Israel and the other three (who had been out of the country at the time) forbidden from re-entering. She was eventually placed under town-arrest in al-Bireh.

In 1996 she ran for president of the Palestinian Authority, losing to Yasser Arafat, while garnering 11.5% of the vote.

A grandmother of 13, Khalil remained an active member in the political scene, serving on the Palestinian National Council up until her death in 1999.

References

External links
Al Inaash al-Usra society
Samiha Khalil biography, at PASSIA

1923 births
1999 deaths
People from Anabta
Palestinian clothing
Palestinian women in politics
Palestine Liberation Organization members
Democratic Front for the Liberation of Palestine politicians